De'Angelo Wilson (March 29, 1979 – November 26, 2008) was an American film and television actor and rapper. He was best known for his role as DJ Iz in the 2002 hip hop drama film 8 Mile.

Early life
Wilson was born in Dayton, Ohio. He attended the University of Cincinnati and Kent State University, in Kent, Ohio, where he studied acting.

Career
Wilson appeared in four films, including as DJ Iz in 8 Mile (2002) and as Jesse (age 19) in Antwone Fisher (2002). He also appeared in two television productions.

Death
Wilson died by suicide by hanging in Los Angeles in 2008.

Filmography

Film

Television

Notes

External links

https://web.archive.org/web/20081211073012/http://livesteez.com/Aggregates/view/7730 
https://web.archive.org/web/20081212112810/http://www.eurweb.com/story/eur49221.cfm 
Lu, Anne (December 9, 2008).  "8 Mile Actor De'Angelo Wilson Found Dead".  All Headline News.  Accessed January 18, 2010.

1979 births
2008 deaths
2008 suicides
20th-century American male actors
African-American male actors
African-American record producers
American male film actors
American male television actors
Male actors from Dayton, Ohio
Record producers from California
Kent State University alumni
Suicides by hanging in California
20th-century African-American people
21st-century African-American people